Wild Romance is a 2010 novel by Chloe Schama. It recounts the story of an infamous marriage scandal that took place during the Victorian era in Ireland and the United Kingdom, known as the Yelverton Case. It was greatly publicized in the press of the day, echoing the mass media coverage that is common today.

Plot summary
It was a chance meeting on a steamboat in 1852 between a 19-year-old Theresa Longworth and Charles Yelverton, a soldier in his thirties, and heir to the title of Viscount Avonmore.

After a five-year clandestine romance hidden from the public eye, the affair blossomed until they finally got married in secret in Edinburgh. The following summer they remarried again in Dublin, once more in secret, but this time in the presence of a priest. This was at the request of Theresa, who was a Roman Catholic, while Charles had been brought up a Protestant. The validity of the marriage was later questioned in court.

Characters
The source of her novel Martyrs of Circumstance written by Theresa later on in life, they were unable to live together following the Irish wedding as husband and wife. When Charles later married another woman, Theresa felt compelled to take him to court for bigamy in an attempt to prove that they had been officially married.

A number of trials took place over the following years in Dublin, Edinburgh and in London at the House of Lords, and generated a large public interest through the media coverage that such a scandal solicited. Every detail of the case was reported in the newspapers and the interest generated novels written by writers such as Wilkie Collins as well as ballads written and dedicated to the plea of Theresa.

Victorian press coverage
Having suffered greatly from the public exposure and scandal that resulted from the press coverage, Theresa's dream of living a happy married life was impossible in the Victorian age. Therefore, she embarked on a journey that would take her around the world, during which she wrote numerous novels about her travels and experiences. She notably met a young John Muir in the Yosemite of the late 19th century. Her accounts opened the door for independent women to travel in the twentieth century.

External links
Review of the novel at The Guardian

Historical novels